Dede Rosyada (born 5 October 1957) is a Muslim academic and intellectual from Indonesia. He has been rector of UIN Syarif Hidayatullah Jakarta since 2015.

Position 
 Rector, UIN Syarif Hidayatullah Jakarta, 2015–2019
 Director of Islamic Higher Education, Ministry of Religious Affairs (Indonesia), 2011–2014
 Acting Rector, IAIN Sulthan Thaha Saefudin Jambi, 2011

Education 
 Bachelor of Islamic Education, UIN Syarif Hidayatullah Jakarta
 Master of Islamic Studies, UIN Syarif Hidayatullah Jakarta
 Doctor of Islamic Studies, UIN Syarif Hidayatullah Jakarta
 Post Doctoral Programme, McGill University
 Visiting Scholar, Ohio University

Books 
 Paradigma Pendidikan Demokratis, Sebuah Model Pelibatan Masyarakat dalam Pengelolaan Sekolah (Prenada Media : 2004)
 Pendidikan Kewargaan, Demokrasi, HAM dan Civil Society (IAIN Press : 2001) dan (Prenada Media : 2003)
 Metode kajian Hukum Dewan Hisbah PERSIS (Logos Wacana Ilmu : 1999)
 Sejarah dan Ilmu al-Qur'an (Dede Rosyada dan tim, Pustaka Firdaus : 1999)
 Ilmu Ushul Fiqh (Departemen Agama RI : 1998)
 Teguh Beriman motto daerah Khusus Ibukota, Jakarta (Pemerintah Daerah Khusus Ibukota, Jakarta : 1997)
 Dirasah Islamiyah (KODI pemerintah Daerah Khusus Ibukota, Jakarta : 1997)
 Pendidikan Pengamalan Ibadah (Departemen Agama RI : 1996)
 Gerakan Dissiplin Nasional dalam perspektif Islam (Kantor Tramtib, Pemda DKI, Jakarta : 1996)
 Pedoman Zakat untuk masyarakat Muslim Jakarta (Badan Amil Zakat, Infaq dan Shadaqah, Pemda DKI : 1995)
 Ilmu Agama Islam II (Binbaga Islam Departemen Agama RI : 1995)
 Ilmu Agama Islam I (Binbaga Islam Departemen Agama RI : 1994)
 Ilmu-Ilmu al-Qur'an (LBIQ DKI Jakarta : 1993)
 Tema-Tema Pokok al-Qur'an (LBIQ KI Jakarta : 1993)
 Hukum Islam dan Pranata Sosial (PT Rajawali : 1992)

References 

Academic staff of Syarif Hidayatullah State Islamic University Jakarta
Living people
Syarif Hidayatullah State Islamic University Jakarta alumni
1957 births